James Alexander Gant (born 7 April 1988) is an English actor and singer best known for performing in Musical Theatre in the West End, London.

Early life
Gant attended Saffron Walden County High School in Saffron Walden, was a company member of Youth Music Theatre UK and ultimately completed his professional acting training at Mountview Academy of Theatre Arts in 2010.  His first professional role was in the musical Evita on the UK and International Tour in 2009/10.

Work in Theatre 

Gant has performed on stage in the United Kingdom for nearly 10 years. Notable productions in which he has appeared include Les Misérables, Oliver!, Titanic (musical), Jekyll and Hyde (musical), and Grand Hotel. Most recently, he played Death opposite Zoe Doano in Death Takes a Holiday at the Charing Cross Theatre in London
and then he starred in Julian Fellowes new musical The Wind in the Willows at the London Palladium, UK.
Gant appeared in Twelfth Night and A Christmas Carol in Stratford-upon-Avon from Nov 2017 and Feb 2018.

Theatre credits

References 

1988 births
Living people
Alumni of British Youth Music Theatre